Sir Ian David Macfadyen,  (born 19 February 1942) is a senior Royal Air Force officer, a former Lieutenant Governor of the Isle of Man (2000–05) and Constable and Governor of Windsor Castle (2009–14).

RAF career
Born the son of Air Marshal Sir Douglas Macfadyen, Ian Macfadyen was educated at Marlborough College and entered the RAF College Cranwell in 1960.

After service in fighter squadrons, in 1970 he became a flying instructor and a member of the Poachers formation aerobatic team at the Royal Air Force College Cranwell.

In 1980 as a wing commander he was appointed Officer Commanding of No. 29 Squadron flying F4 Phantom aircraft at RAF Coningsby with whom he saw operational service in the Falkland Islands, and Officer Commanding of No. 23 Squadron in 1983.

In 1985 as a group captain he was Station Commander at RAF Leuchars in Fife

In 1989 he became the Chief of Staff, Headquarters British Forces Middle East and later became the Commander of British Forces. From 1991 as an air vice marshal he was Assistant Chief of the Defence Staff, Operational Requirements (Air Systems) – ACAS OR (Air).

In 1994 he was promoted to Air Marshal and became Director General of the Saudi Arabia Armed Forces Project.

He retired from the RAF in February 1999.

Later life
In October 2000 Macfadyen was appointed Lieutenant Governor of the Isle of Man.

From 2006 to 2008 he was the National President of the Royal British Legion and later the Honorary Inspector General of the Royal Auxiliary Air Force.

In October 2009 Macfadyen became Constable and Governor of Windsor Castle in succession to Vice Admiral Ian Jenkins. Before retirement from this post in July 2014, Macfadyen was knighted by the Queen as a Knight Commander of the Royal Victorian Order in a private ceremony in Windsor Castle.

References

External links
Debrett's – Air Marshal I D Macfadyen

|-
 

|-

|-
 

|-

 

|-

 

1942 births
Living people
Knights Commander of the Royal Victorian Order
Companions of the Order of the Bath
Officers of the Order of the British Empire
Royal Air Force air marshals
Fellows of the Royal Aeronautical Society
Graduates of the Royal Air Force College Cranwell
People educated at Marlborough College
Royal Air Force air marshals of the Gulf War
Lieutenant Governors of the Isle of Man
Recipients of the Commendation for Valuable Service in the Air